The Karakalpaks or Qaraqalpaqs, are a Turkic ethnic group native to Karakalpakstan in Northwestern Uzbekistan. During the 18th century, they settled in the lower reaches of the Amu Darya and in the (former) delta of Amu Darya on the southern shore of the Aral Sea. The name "Karakalpak" comes from two words: qara meaning "black" and qalpaq meaning "hat". The Karakalpaks number nearly 620,000 worldwide, out of which about 500,000 live in the Uzbek Republic of Karakalpakstan.

Etymology 
The word Karakalpak is derived from the Russian Cyrillic spelling of their name and has become the accepted name for these people in the West. The Karakalpaks endonymically refer to themselves as Qaraqalpaqs, whilst the Uzbeks call them Qoraqalpoqs. The word means "black hat" and has caused much confusion in the past, since historians linked them with other earlier peoples (such as Cherniye Klobuki), who have borne the appellation "black hat" in Slavic vernacular. The Qaraqul hat is made from the fur of the Qaraqul breed of sheep which originated in Central Asia with archaeological evidence pointing to the breed being raised there continuously since 1400 BCE. The breed is named after Qorako‘l which is a city in Bukhara Province in Uzbekistan.

History 

Many accounts continue to link the present-day Karakalpaks with the Turkic confederation known as the Cherniye Klobuki of the 11th century, whose name also means "black hat" in Russian. Cherniye Klobuki were mercenary military troops of the Kievan Rus. Apart from the fact that their names have the same meaning, there is no archaeological or historical evidence to link these two groups.

The Karakalpaks, Uzbeks, and Kazakhs are regarded to be subgroups of the same Uzbek Confederation that arose in the fifteenth century following the breakdown of Genghis Khan's empire and the collapse of the Golden Horde. The Karakalpak group was formed in the seventeenth century as a result of a split from the Kazakh confederation.

Recent archaeological evidence indicates that the Karakalpaks may have formed as a confederation of different tribes at some time in the late 15th or the 16th centuries at some location along the Syr Darya or its southern Zhany Darya outlet, in proximity to the Kazakhs of the Lesser Horde. This would explain why their language, customs, and material culture are so similar to that of the Kazakhs.

Geography 

The Karakalpak population is mainly confined to the central part of Karakalpakstan that is irrigated by the Amu Darya. The largest communities live in Nukus, the capital of Karakalpakstan and the surrounding large towns, such as Khodzheli, Shimbay, Takhtaitash, Shomanay and Kungrad. Although their homeland bears their name, the Karakalpaks are not the largest ethnic group living in Karakalpakstan. They are increasingly being outnumbered by Uzbeks, many of whom are being encouraged to move into the rich agricultural region around Turtkul and Beruniy.

Rural Karakalpaks mainly live on former collective or state farms, most of which have been recently privatised. Many rural Karakalpaks have been seriously affected by the desiccation of the Aral Sea, which has destroyed the local fishing industry along with much of the grazing and agricultural land in the north of the delta. Karakalpaks have nowhere to go. The majority of Karakalpakstan is occupied by desert: the Kyzyl Kum on the eastern side, the barren Ustyurt Plateau to the west and now the growing Aralkum to the north, once the bed of the former Aral Sea.

Language 

The Karakalpak language belongs to the Kipchak–Nogai group of Turkic languages, which also includes Kazakh and Nogai. Spoken Karakalpak has two dialects: Northeastern and Southwestern. Written Karakalpak uses both a modified form of the Cyrillic alphabet and Latin alphabet, with the former being standard during the Soviet Union and the latter modelled on Uzbekistan's alphabet reform for Uzbek. Before the Soviet Union, Karakalpak was rarely written, but when it was it used a modified form of the Perso-Arabic alphabet.

Due to the geography and history of the Karakalpak people, Karakalpak has been influenced by Uzbek, Mongol, Tajik and Russian. A Karakalpak-Uzbek pidgin language is often spoken by those bilingual in both languages.

Religion 

Karakalpaks are primarily followers of the Hanafi School of Sunni Islam. It is probable they adopted Islam between the 10th and 13th centuries, a period when they first appeared as a distinct ethnic group.

Dervish orders such as the Naqshbandi, Kubrawiya, Yasawi and Qalandari are fairly common in the region. The religious order that established the strongest relationship with the people of the region is the Kubrawiya, which has Shi'i adherents.

Of 553 mosques recorded in 1914, a few remain in No'kis, Törtkül, Xojeli, and Shimbay. Many Karakalpak mullahs use their homes for Friday prayers.

See also 

 Uzbeks
 Chorni Klobuky

Notes

References 

 Richardson, David; Richardson, Sue (2012), Qaraqalpaqs of the Aral Delta, Prestel Verlag, . Retrieved 2012-07-27
 MaryLee Knowlton: Uzbekistan. Marshall Cavendish 2005, pp. 54–58
 Shirin Akiner: Islamic Peoples of the Soviet Union, Taylor & Francis 1983, pp. 338–345
 James Stuart Olson, Nicholas Charles Pappas: An Ethnohistorical Dictionary of the Russian and Soviet empires. Greenwood Publishing Group 1994, pp. 343–345
 David J. Phillips: Peoples on the Move: Introducing the Nomads of the World. William Carey Library 2001, p. 304

External links 

 
 The Qaraqalpaqs
 Karakalpakstan

Turkic peoples of Asia
Ethnic groups in Uzbekistan
Ethnic groups in Turkmenistan
Ethnic groups in Kazakhstan
Muslim communities in Asia